The Japanese destroyer {{nihongo|Momi|樅}} was the lead ship of her class of 21 second-class destroyers built for the Imperial Japanese Navy (IJN) during the late 1910s. She was converted into an experimental ship in 1932 and later scrapped.

Design and description
The Momi class was designed with higher speed and better seakeeping than the preceding  second-class destroyers. Momi was powered by two Brown-Curtis geared steam turbines, each driving one propeller shaft using steam provided by three Kampon water-tube boilers. Their crew consisted of 110 officers and crewmen.

The main armament of the Momi-class ships consisted of three  Type 3 guns in single mounts; one gun forward of the well deck, one between the two funnels, and the last gun atop the aft superstructure. The guns were numbered '1' to '3' from front to rear. The ships carried two above-water twin sets of  torpedo tubes; one mount was in the well deck between the forward superstructure and the bow gun and the other between the aft funnel and aft superstructure.

Construction and career
Momi, built at the Yokosuka Naval Arsenal, was launched on 10 June 1919 and completed on 27 December. She was stricken from the Navy List on 1 April 1932 and became an experimental hulk at Yokosuka before being broken up at an unknown date.

Notes

References

1919 ships
Ships built by Yokosuka Naval Arsenal
Momi-class destroyers